Pediasia batangensis is a moth in the family Crambidae. It was described by Aristide Caradja in 1939. It is found in Xizang, China.

References

Crambini
Moths described in 1939
Moths of Asia